Emma Coss is a former English female footballer.

After playing professionally for Arsenal, she joined Charlton late during the 2001/02 season and was also capable of playing in defensive positions. During the 2003–04 FA Women's Premier League Cup, she came on as a substitute and with her first touch, scored the only goal to secure victory for Charlton Athletic, the club's first major trophy.

Prior to pursuing a professional football career, Coss had taken up modelling. During a photo shoot, she turned up with a broken nose from playing football and the agency demanded she quit playing, however she chose to give up modelling due to her love of playing football. In her youth, Coss considered herself to be a tomboy and would play in boy's teams up to her early teens. In 2003, she described her favourite footballer as David Beckham.

Honours
Arsenal
 FA Women's Cup: 1995

Charlton
 FA Women's Cup: 2005
 FA Women's Premier League Cup: 2003–04

References

Living people
Women's association football defenders
Arsenal W.F.C. players
Charlton Athletic W.F.C. players
English women's footballers
FA Women's National League players
1979 births